is a Japanese manga service. Originally launched in January 2017, the service hosts manga series published by Square Enix. The service also serializes original works, many of which are derived from other media. In July 2022, the website launched internationally in English. Upon release, the service was criticized for its censorship and monetization model.

History
The service originally launched in Japan on January 7, 2017, with an iOS and Android app and website.

An English-language version of the service was launched on July 25, 2022. It featured mostly titles published by Square Enix's manga publishing division, along with series from other publishers that were published by Square Enix in Japan and series that had not been published in English at the time.

Serializations
In addition to previously published works, the service also serializes works. Many of these works are adaptations of other media, such as video games, multimedia franchises, and light novels.

Reception
Japanese website Appmedia praised the works and free content of the app. The app was nominated for the 2017 Google Play Awards in Japan. The app has 20 million downloads as of November 2022.

Global
Upon the service's international release, many users criticized its censorship. In particular, some critics pointed out that the censorship included knees and elbows. Jason Faulkner from GameRevolution also noted that risqué series like My Dress-Up Darling had characters that were mostly obscured. He also felt the censorship was likely done by a machine.

Criticism was also directed at the service's monetization model. Isaiah Colbert of Kotaku unfavorably compared the monetization to microtransactions in video games. Faulkner described the monetization as "nonsensical" and criticized the pricing as overly expensive.

On July 27, 2022, Manga Up! issued a response to the censorship complaints. The response cited censorship policies in non-English countries like Indonesia as the reasoning for the censorship. On September 4, 2022, Square Enix announced that all the censorship via black bars had been removed and replaced with less-intrusive censorship methods.

References

External links
  
 

Anime and manga controversies
Comics censorship
Internet properties established in 2017
Manga hosting services
Square Enix